The Wilderness Medical Society was created on 15 February 1983 by three physicians from California, United States — Dr. Paul Auerbach, Dr. Ed Geehr, and Dr. Ken Kizer. It is the largest international non-profit membership organization devoted to addressing wilderness medicine challenges, more specifically defined as "medical care delivered in those areas where fixed or transient geographic challenges reduce availability of, or alter requirements for, medical or patient movement resources". It also publishes Wilderness & Environmental Medicine Journal, Wilderness Medicine Magazine, and Wilderness Medicine Clinical Practice Guidelines.

Academy of Wilderness Medicine

The academy seeks to provide a system of adult education and certification in a modern and standardised way to provide a set level of knowledge and education for practitioners working in the wilderness arena.

The goals of the academy are to:
 Professional designation for achievement in Wilderness Medicine
 Validation for the public, patients, and clients of practitioner education in  Wilderness Medicine
 Recognition for completing high quality standards in Wilderness Medicine
 Continuing medical education (CME) credit for acquisition of knowledge and hands-on experiences in Wilderness Medicine
 The advancement of an internationally recognized curriculum of Wilderness Medicine categories, topics, and skills

The Academy also maintains the curriculum for the Fellowship award. This curriculum is completed over a maximum of a 5-year period and culminates in the award of Fellow being bestowed at the Society's annual conference. The award of the Fellowship allows the holder to use the post-nominal letters FAWM (Fellow of the Academy of Wilderness Medicine), as of early 2020 there were just over 600 current Fellows. The Academy also manages a "Master's Degree Fellow Program", which bestows a Master Fellow designation, allowing the holder to use the post-nominal letters MFAWM (Master Fellow of the Academy of Wilderness Medicine). The Master Fellow degree program is an advanced, post-fellow certification that was created to denote individuals who have excelled in a specific sub-discipline within the scope of wilderness medicine in addition to being Fellows of the Academy of Wilderness Medicine. The Master program is an attempt to:
 Further the academic programs of the WMS. 
 Allow additional academic enrichment opportunities for WMS members. 
 Create a group of experts in specific sub-disciplines for utilization in teaching, lecturing and research development. 
 Create a cadre of ever-evolving leaders for the WMS to utilize.

FAWM curriculum

The curriculum for participants wishing to gain fellowship is modular and is divided into Electives, Required Topics and Experience:

Required/Core Topics are divided into twelve sub-headings:
Diving and Hyperbaric Medicine
Tropical and Travel Medicine
High Altitude & Mountaineering Medicine
Expedition Medicine
Field Craft and Equipment
Rescue and Evacuation
Sports Medicine and Physiology
Preventive Medicine, Field Sanitation & Hygiene
General Environmental Medicine
Improvised and Alternative Medicine
Disaster & Humanitarian Assistance
Wilderness Emergencies and Trauma Management

FAWM credits can be gained in a number of ways such as:
Attending WMS conferences
Completing online tests after reading journal articles
Watching online lectures
Publishing peer-reviewed articles
Teaching in the area of Wilderness Medicine

Activities
The Wilderness Medical Society organize annual conferences and meetings for members and interested parties.

Notable Fellows
Dr. Paul Auerbach – Founder of WMS and past president of the WMS.
Dr. Lt Col Sean Hudson MBE - Co-founder of World Extreme Medicine (WEM) awarded by Queen Elizabeth II and MBE for his services to Medicine 
Dr. Paul Bromley – Senior Advanced Clinical Practitioner, prehospital clinician and lecturer in clinical physiology.
Dr. Sundeep Dhillon – Physician and physiologist.
Dr. Hannah Evans – GP and expedition medicine instructor and lecturer.
Dr. Clayton Everline – Author of 2 editions of "Surf Survival" (2011, 2019) and Sports Medicine doctor on Oahu.
Dr. Seth C. Hawkins – First physician to be designated a Master Fellow; editor of the textbook Wilderness EMS; executive editor of Wilderness Medicine Magazine; founder of the Carolina Wilderness EMS Externship.
Mr. Rhodri Jordan – Remote Paramedic and educationalist.
Dr. Tom E Mallinson – GP and Paramedic, Prehospital Doctor and Academic. Lecturer for the College of Remote and Offshore Medicine
Mr. Aebhric O'Kelly – Dean of the College of Remote and Offshore Medicine and FRSM.
Dr. Matt Wilkes – Senior Editor of the Adventure Medic Website, PhD researcher and anaesthetist.

Affiliated groups

Backcountry Pulse
College of Remote and Offshore Medicine, Malta.
Expedition and Wilderness Medicine
Advanced Wilderness Life Support (AWLS)
NOLS Wilderness Medicine
American College of Emergency Physicians – Wilderness Section
International Hypoxia Symposia
Everest ER
Institute for Altitude Medicine
Wilderness Medical Associates
EcoMed
Wilderness Medicine Programs – Roane State Community College
Mountain & Marine Medicine
Waves of Health
Argentine Mountain Medicine Society
WildMedix
Hawk Ventures

References

External links
 The Wilderness Medical Society home page

Medical associations based in the United States
Wilderness medicine
Medical and health organizations based in Utah